Amlapura is the regency seat of Karangasem, Bali, Indonesia. Previously named Karangasem, it was changed in 1963 after the eruption of Mount Agung. The capital city is Amlapura City.

History
New city must be built at that time because most office complexes that were built during the Dutch East Indies Government were destroyed by the lava floods of the eruption of Mount Agung in 1963, the name of the new city is named Amlapura which consists of amla means amla fruit and pura means place.
Refers to the name of the previous Puri Kelodan, namely Puri Amlaraja. As well as consideration that in the Negarakretagama or Warnana village colophon in the Griya Pidada Karangasem. In the colophon Negarakretagama manuscript states that the lontar is finished written in Amlanegantun (wus puput sinurat ring Amlanagantu). In addition, there are also considerations that Babad Dalem.

The 1991 song 'Amlapura' on Tin Machine's album Tin Machine II references the place, which David Bowie the frontman of the band had visited.

Awards
2011: For third consecutives, Amlapura City got Adipura Award as Indonesia Cleanest Small City and also got Adiwiyata Award for fourth consecutives as the Cleanest Elementary School.

Climate
Amlapura has a tropical savanna climate (Aw) with moderate to little rainfall from April to October and heavy rainfall from November to March.

References

External links

Regency seats of Bali
Karangasem Regency